Ruino Vino is the fourth studio album by the Australian world music quintet, Mara!. It was released in 1995.

At the ARIA Music Awards of 1996, the album won the ARIA Award for Best World Music Album.

Track listing 
 "Ruino Vino" - 1:40
 "Men Suffer Too" - 1:50
 "Fair Kop" - 3:43
 "Ajde" - 4:36
 "The Big Dance" - 2:30
 "Dance of Dospat" - 6:23
 "Lambkin" - 7:15
 "Jove" - 3:30
 "Past Carin'" - 7:10
 "Llew's Blues" - 3:45
 "Tu Madre" - 6:37

References 

1995 albums
ARIA Award-winning albums